The Glaser-Dirks DG-600 is a glider manufactured by Glaser-Dirks as a successor to the DG-202 and DG-400 series of gliders where carbon fiber reinforced plastics was used.

Design and development
The DG-600 fuselage is based on the fuselage of the DG-400 but with a more slender tailboom which also incorporates a tailfin ballast tank with a capacity of 7 liters. The design of the canopy and the instrument panel is practically the same as on other DG gliders.

The control surfaces incorporate flaperons which serve as both flaps and ailerons. The wing has a newly designed thinner airfoil and higher aspect ratio than previous types of DG gliders. This gives a higher performance but at a cost of worse slow-speed characteristics, making it less suitable for gliding competitions with frequent gaggles in thermals. The same problem is also noticeable on LS-7 and ASW-24 gliders, where improved performance was to be achieved with thinner airfoils.

The negative effects (i.e. a stall without much warning) of this design are most pronounced on 15-meter wingspan without winglets. These characteristics caused the relative unpopularity of this glider and only 114 aircraft were produced (partially because the moulds were later destroyed in a factory fire). Later versions with 17 and 18 m wingspan offer much better low-speed handling.

Variants
DG-600/15original version with 15 m wingspan
DG-600/17version with 17 m wingspan (later changed to 18 m)
DG-600Mwith Rotax 275 engine, capable of self launching
DG-600/18
DG-600M
DG-600/18M

Specifications (15m wings)

NOTE: The following data represent later versions of DG-600

See also
List of gliders

References

External links

DG-600 Article  at Scale Soaring UK
DG Flugzeugbau GmbH

1980s German sailplanes
DG Flugzeugbau aircraft
T-tail aircraft
Aircraft first flown in 1987